The All India Chess Federation (AICF) is central administrative body for the game of chess in India. Founded in 1951, the federation is affiliated to Fédération Internationale des Échecs (FIDE), the world body for chess. The AICF has produced Viswanathan Anand, Nihal Sarin, Pentala Harikrishna, Rameshbabu Praggnanandhaa and Vidit Santosh Gujrathi and many other grandmasters. The organisation is also in charge of managing women's chess in India. AICF's current headquarter is in New Delhi.

History
The All India Chess Federation was registered in 12 December 1958 and was registered as a Society under the Societies Registration act of 1860.

In August 2022, AICF hosted the 44th Chess Olympiad in Chennai, India, which was the first Chess Olympiad ever to take place in the country. The event was organised by AICF in association with the International Chess Federation (FIDE) and the Tamil Nadu Government. The current AICF President, Sanjay Kapoor was the President of the Organising Committee for the 44th Chess Olympiad, and AICF Secretary, Bharat Singh Chauhan was the Tournament Director.

Charges of bureaucratic interference
AICF has been repeatedly accused of bureaucratic interference. In October 2009, chess Grandmaster Humpy Koneru (then female world No. 2) accused the AICF secretary DV Sundar of preventing her from participating in the 37th Chess Olympiad in Turin. The same year the AICF was accused of arbitrarily banning grandmaster G N Gopal for not playing in a match (the ban was subsequently revoked).

In 2012 the AICF president N Srinivasan was criticised for not supporting Viswanathan Anand in World Chess Championship 2010, by not trying to host the match in India.

However, things appear to be changing for better since the present management took over on January 04, 2021. The new AICF President, Sanjay Kapoor, and Secretary, Bharat Singh Chauhan have taken a slew of measures to ensure that the Federation actively focuses on promoting Chess sport in the country and works towards empowering the players.

Affiliates
Till date the federation has more than 30 affiliated state associations, 16 special members and 23 recognised academies as its constituents. Here is a list of them:

Affiliated state bodies

All Arunachal Pradesh Chess Association
All Assam Chess Association
All Bihar Chess Association
All J&K Chess Association
All Jharkhand Chess Association
All Rajputana Chess Association
All Tripura Chess Association
Andaman Nicobar Chess Assn
Andhra Pradesh Chess Association
Bengal Chess Association
Chess Association – Kerala
Chandigarh Chess Association
Chess Association of Uttaranchal
Delhi Chess Association
Gujarat State Chess Association
Goa State Chess Association
H.P.State Chess Association
Madhya Kshetra Shatranj Sangh
Maharashtra Chess Association
Manipur Chess Association
Meghalaya Chess Association
Mizoram Chess Association
Nagaland Chess Association
Orissa Chess Association
Pondicherry State Chess Assn
Punjab State Chess Association
The Haryana Chess Association
Tamil Nadu State Chess Association
Telangana State Chess Association 
 United Karnataka Chess Association
United Chess Association Of Chhattisgarh
UP Chess Sports Association

Special units

AAI Sports Control Board
 Air India Sports Promotion Board
All India Chess Federation for the Blind
 BSNL Sports and Cultural Board
Defence Accounts Sports Control Board
Delhi Development Authority
 Indian Bank Central Sports Committee
LIC Sports Promotion Board
 Ordnance Factory Board
Petroleum Sports Control Board
Railway sports Promotion Board
Services Sports Control Board

Chess Acadamies India

Premier chess academy
Kaabil Kids
Hobspace
Capablanca Chess School
Maestro Chess Academy
Victorious Chess Academy
South Mumbai Chess Academy
Bangalore Chess Academy
Chess Gurukul
Kingshekhar Chess Academy
Eight Times Eight Academy

Events
AICF has also played host to a number of major world events in India. Some of them are:
World Junior Championships
Commonwealth Chess Championship
Asian Team Championships
44th Chess Olympiad

References

External links
 

India
Chess in India
Chess
1951 establishments in Madras State
Sports organizations established in 1951
Chess organizations
1951 in chess
Organisations based in Tamil Nadu